Park Han-bin (born 21 September 1997) is a South Korean football midfielder who plays for Gwangju FC.

Club career 
Park joined Daegu FC in 2016 and made his league debut against FC Anyang on 25 May 2016.

International career 
He has been a member of the South Korea national U-20 team since 2015.

Club career statistics

References

External links 
 

1997 births
Living people
Association football midfielders
South Korean footballers
South Korean expatriate footballers
Daegu FC players
Gwangju FC players
FC Slovan Liberec players
K League 2 players
K League 1 players
South Korean expatriates in the Czech Republic
Expatriate footballers in the Czech Republic
South Korea youth international footballers